Ringway is a civil parish in Manchester, England. It contains five listed buildings that are recorded in the National Heritage List for England. All the listed buildings are designated at Grade II, the lowest of the three grades, which is applied to "buildings of national importance and special interest". The parish is almost completely occupied by Manchester Airport and its approach roads, and what otherwise remains is rural. The listed buildings consist of houses and a bridge.


Buildings

References

Citations

Sources

Lists of listed buildings in Greater Manchester
Buildings and structures in Manchester